The First Baptist Church in Las Vegas, New Mexico is a historic Baptist church at 700 University Avenue. It was built in 1922 and added to the National Register of Historic Places in 1985.

It is a three-story utilitarian building.  It served the Baptist congregation in Las Vegas which was organized in 1880 and had its first church building by 1885.

See also

National Register of Historic Places listings in San Miguel County, New Mexico

References

External links

Churches completed in 1922
Churches in Las Vegas, New Mexico
Baptist churches in New Mexico
Churches on the National Register of Historic Places in New Mexico
National Register of Historic Places in San Miguel County, New Mexico